There are around 350 genera in the plant family Brassicaceae. The type genus is Brassica (cabbage and mustards). Genera with a large number of species are Alyssum (madworts), Arabis (rockcresses), Cardamine (bittercresses), Draba (whitlow-grasses), Erysimum (wallflowers), Heliophila, Lepidium (pepperworts),  Noccaea,  Odontarrhena, Physaria (bladderpods), and Rorippa (yellowcresses).

The following list includes the genera that are accepted by either the 2021 Update on the Brassicaceae species checklist or v1.3 of BrassiBase (as accessed in late 2021). Most genera are accepted by both sources; those supported by only one of them are flagged with a footnote.

A–B

Acirostrum
Acuston
Aethionema
Aimara
Alliaria
Alshehbazia
Alyssoides
Alyssopsis
Alyssum
Ammosperma
Anastatica
Anchonium
Andrzeiowskia
Anelsonia
Anzhengxia
Aphragmus
Aplanodes
Arabidella
Arabidopsis
Arabis
Arcyosperma
Armoracia
Aschersoniodoxa
Asperuginoides
Asta
Atacama
Atelanthera
Athysanus
Atropatenia
Aubrieta
Aurinia
Baimashania
Ballantinia
Barbarea
Bengt-jonsellia
Berteroa
Biscutella
Bivonaea
Blennodia
Boechera
Bornmuellera
Borodinia
Borodiniopsis
Botschantzevia
Brachypus
Brassica
Braya
Brayopsis
Bunias

C–D

Cakile
Calepina
Callothlaspi
Calymmatium
Camelina
Capsella
Cardamine
Carinavalva
Carrichtera
Catenulina
Catolobus
Ceratocnemum
Chamira
Chartoloma
Chaunanthus
Chilocardamum
Chlorocrambe
Chorispora
Christolea
Chrysochamela
Cithareloma
Clastopus
Clausia
Clypeola
Cochlearia
Coincya
Conringia
Cordylocarpus
Crambe
Crambella
Cremolobus
Crucihimalaya
Cryptospora
Cuphonotus
Cuprella
Cusickiella
Cymatocarpus
Cyphocardamum
Dactylocardamum
Degenia
Delpinophytum
Dendroarabis
Descurainia
Diceratella
Dichasianthus
Dictyophragmus
Didesmus
Didymophysa
Dielsiocharis
Dilophia
Dimorphocarpa
Diplotaxis
Dipoma
Diptychocarpus
Dithyrea
Dontostemon
Douepea
Draba
Drabastrum
Drabella
Dryopetalon

E–I

Eigia
Elburzia
Enarthrocarpus
Englerocharis
Eremobium
Eremoblastus
Eremophyton
Eruca
Erucaria
Erucastrum
Erysimum
Euclidium
Eudema
Eunomia
Eutrema
Exhalimolobos
Farsetia
Fezia
Fibigia
Foleyola
Fortuynia
Fourraea
Friedrichkarlmeyeria
Galitzkya
Geococcus
Glastaria
Goerkemia
Goldbachia
Graellsia
Guenthera
Guiraoa
Halimolobos
Harmsiodoxa
Heldreichia
Heliophila
Hemicrambe
Hemilophia
Henophyton
Hesperidanthus
Hesperis
Hilliella
Hirschfeldia
Hollermayera
Hormathophylla
Hornungia
Horwoodia
Ianhedgea
Iberis
Idahoa
Ihsanalshehbazia
Iodanthus
Ionopsidium
Irania
Irenepharsus
Isatis
Iskandera
Ivania

K–M

Kernera
Kotschyella
Kremeriella
Lachnocapsa
Lachnoloma
Ladakiella
Leavenworthia
Leiocarpaea
Leiospora
Lepidium
Lepidostemon
Lepidotrichum
Leptaleum
Lithodraba
Litwinowia
Lobularia
Lunaria
Lutzia
Lyrocarpa
Lysakia
Machaerophorus
Macropodium
Malcolmia
Mancoa
Marcus-kochia
Maresia
Masmenia
Mathewsia
Matthiola
Megacarpaea
Megadenia
Meniocus
Menkea
Menonvillea
Metashangrilaia
Micrantha
Microlepidium
Microstigma
Microthlaspi
Morettia
Moricandia
Morisia
Mostacillastrum
Mummenhoffia
Murbeckiella
Muricaria
Myagrum

N–P

Nasturtiopsis
Nasturtium
Neotorularia
Nerisyrenia
Neslia
Neuontobotrys
Neurotropis
Nevada
Noccaea
Noccidium
Notoceras
Notothlaspi
Ochthodium
Octoceras
Odontarrhena
Olimarabidopsis
Onuris
Oreophyton
Ornithocarpa
Orychophragmus
Otocarpus
Pachycladon
Pachymitus
Pachyneurum
Pachyphragma
Parlatoria
Parodiodoxa
Parolinia
Parrya
Parryodes
Paysonia
Pegaeophyton
Peltaria
Peltariopsis
Pennellia
Petiniotia
Petrocallis
Petroravenia
Phlebolobium
Phlegmatospermum
Phoenicaulis
Phravenia
Phyllolepidum
Physaria
Physoptychis
Physorhynchus
Planodes
Polyctenium
Polypsecadium
Pringlea
Pseuderucaria
Pseudoarabidopsis
Pseudocamelina
Pseudodraba
Pseudofortuynia
Pseudosempervivum
Pseudoturritis
Pseudovesicaria
Psychine
Pterygostemon
Pugionium
Pycnoplinthopsis
Pycnoplinthus

Q–S

Quezeliantha
Quidproquo
Raffenaldia
Raphanorhyncha
Raphanus
Rapistrum
Resetnikia
Rhammatophyllum
Rhizobotrya
Ricotia
Robeschia
Romanschulzia
Rorippa
Rudolf-kamelinia
Rytidocarpus
Sandbergia
Sarcodraba
Savignya
Scambopus
Scapiarabis
Schimpera
Schizopetalon
Schouwia
Schrenkiella
Scoliaxon
Selenia
Shangrilaia
Shehbazia
Sibara
Sinalliaria
Sinapidendron
Sinapis
Sinoarabis
Sisymbrella
Sisymbriopsis
Sisymbrium
Smelowskia
Sobolewskia
Solms-laubachia
Sphaerocardamum
Spryginia
Stanleya
Stenodraba
Stenopetalum
Sterigmostemum
Stevenia
Streptanthus
Streptoloma
Strigosella
Subularia
Succowia
Synstemon
Synthlipsis

T–Z

Takhtajaniella
Tchihatchewia
Teesdalia
Terraria
Tetracme
Thelypodiopsis
Thelypodium
Thlaspi
Thlaspiceras
Thysanocarpus
Tomostima
Trachystoma
Trichotolinum
Tropidocarpum
Turritis
Vania
Vella
Veselskya
Warea
Weberbauera
Xerodraba
Yinshania
Yosemitea
Zahora
Zerdana
Zilla
Zuloagocardamum
Zuvanda

Notes

References 

 
Brassicaceae